Slovakia competed at the 2004 Summer Olympics in Athens, Greece, from 13 to 29 August 2004. This was the nation's third consecutive appearance at the Summer Olympics since the post-Czechoslovak era. The Slovak Olympic Committee sent a total of 64 athletes to the Games, 48 men and 16 women, to compete in 11 sports. There was only a single competitor in artistic and trampoline gymnastics and sailing.

The Slovak team featured four Olympic medalists from Sydney: freestyle and butterfly swimmer Martina Moravcová, twins Pavol and Peter Hochschorner, and slalom canoeist Michal Martikán, who later became the nation's flag bearer in the opening ceremony. Along with Moravcova, sprint canoeist Peter Páleš and track cyclist Jaroslav Jeřábek were among the Slovak athletes to compete in four editions of the Summer Olympics, although they previously appeared as part of the Czechoslovak team (Pales in 1988; Jerabek and Moravcova in 1992). Other notable Slovak athletes featured professional tennis players Daniela Hantuchová and Karol Beck, rifle shooter and former Olympic medalist Jozef Gönci, and slalom kayak world champion Elena Kaliská.

Slovakia left Athens with a total of six Olympic medals, an equal allocation of gold, silver, and bronze with two each, surpassing a single short of the tally from Sydney four years earlier. While the Hochschorner twins defended their Olympic title in double slalom canoeing, Slovak athletes continued to dominate the sport, as Elena Kaliská and Michal Martikán managed to claim Olympic medals in their respective events. Jozef Gönci added a second bronze to his Olympic career in men's air rifle shooting, while Jozef Krnáč set a historic milestone for Slovakia, after earning the nation's first Olympic medal in judo.

Medalists

Athletics

Slovak athletes have so far achieved qualifying standards in the following athletics events (up to a maximum of 3 athletes in each event at the 'A' Standard, and 1 at the 'B' Standard).

 Key
 Note – Ranks given for track events are within the athlete's heat only
 Q = Qualified for the next round
 q = Qualified for the next round as a fastest loser or, in field events, by position without achieving the qualifying target
 NR = National record
 N/A = Round not applicable for the event
 Bye = Athlete not required to compete in round

Men
Track & road events

Field events

Women
Track & road events

Canoeing

Slalom

Sprint
Men

Women

Qualification Legend: Q = Qualify to final; q = Qualify to semifinal

Cycling

Road

Track
Sprint

Keirin

Omnium

Mountain biking

Gymnastics

Artistic
Women

Trampoline

Judo

Two Slovak judoka qualified for the 2004 Summer Olympics.

Rowing

Slovak rowers qualified the following boats:

Men

Qualification Legend: FA=Final A (medal); FB=Final B (non-medal); FC=Final C (non-medal); FD=Final D (non-medal); FE=Final E (non-medal); FF=Final F (non-medal); SA/B=Semifinals A/B; SC/D=Semifinals C/D; SE/F=Semifinals E/F; R=Repechage

Sailing

Slovak sailors have qualified one boat for each of the following events.

Men

M = Medal race; OCS = On course side of the starting line; DSQ = Disqualified; DNF = Did not finish; DNS= Did not start; RDG = Redress given

Shooting 

Three Slovak shooters (two men and one woman) qualified to compete in the following events:

Men

Women

Swimming

Slovak swimmers earned qualifying standards in the following events (up to a maximum of 2 swimmers in each event at the A-standard time, and 1 at the B-standard time):

Men

Women

Synchronized swimming

Two Slovak synchronized swimmers qualified a spot in the women's duet.

Tennis

Slovakia nominated three male and four female tennis players to compete in the tennis tournament.

Men

Women

Weightlifting

Three Slovak weightlifters qualified for the following events:

Wrestling

 Key
  – Victory by Fall.
  - Decision by Points - the loser with technical points.
  - Decision by Points - the loser without technical points.

Men's freestyle

Men's Greco-Roman

See also
 Slovakia at the 2004 Summer Paralympics

References

External links
Official Report of the XXVIII Olympiad
Slovak Olympic Committee 

Nations at the 2004 Summer Olympics
2004
Summer Olympics